Joseph Molcho born 1692, died 1768 was a rabbi and judge from Thessaloniki, Greece. He is considered one of the most important Greek-Jewish rabbis of his generation, having published several books, including the Shulḥan Gavoah, a restatement of the Arba'ah Turim and the Shulḥan Arukh to reflect the dominant customs in Thessaloniki at the time. He moved to Jerusalem in 1750 and died there.

Biography
Joseph Molcho was born in 1692 to Rabbi Abraham Molcho, a descendant of Jews who fled the Spanish Inquisition. He became the student of the chief rabbi of Thessaloniki, Joseph David. At eighteen he married and had at least three sons. He was considered an expert in shechita and became the head shokhet of Thessaloniki. In 1750 he left his children with his brother and moved to Jerusalem with his father.

Books
 Shulchan Gavoah, a restatement of the Arba'ah Turim and Shulchan Aruch
 Ohel Yosef (a book of responsa first published in Thessaloniki in 1757 
 Zobach Todah on the laws of shechita, first published in Thessaloniki in 1741

References

1692 births
1768 deaths
18th-century rabbis from the Ottoman Empire
Rabbis from Thessaloniki
Sephardi Jews in Ottoman Palestine